Saben Anthonia Lee (born June 23, 1999) is an American professional basketball player for the Phoenix Suns of the National Basketball Association (NBA), on a two-way contract. He played college basketball for the Vanderbilt Commodores and was selected in the second round of the 2020 NBA draft by the Utah Jazz before being subsequently traded to the Detroit Pistons. He has also played for the Philadelphia 76ers.

Early life and high school career
Lee grew up in Phoenix, Arizona and attended Corona del Sol High School in Tempe, Arizona. As a junior, Lee was named first-team All-State after averaging 18 points, five rebounds, and three assists per game. Lee committed to play college basketball at Vanderbilt after his junior year over offers from Louisville, Stanford, Florida State, and Nebraska. He was again named first team All-State as a senior and scored 39 points against Cesar Chavez High School in the state semifinal to lead the Aztecs to the state title game before falling to Basha High School.

College career
Lee served as the Commodores starting point guard as a true freshman and averaged 10.6 points, 3.1 assists and a team-leading 1.2 steals per game. As a sophomore, Lee averaged 12.7 points, 3.3 rebounds, 3.8 assists and 1.0 steals per game. As a junior, he averaged 18.6 points, 3.5 rebounds, 4.2 assists and 1.5 steals per game and was named second team All-SEC by the Associated Press. He scored a career high 38 points on March 3, 2020 in an 87–79 win over Alabama. Following the end of the season, Lee declared for the 2020 NBA draft. On May 1, he announced he was signing with an agent and forgoing his last season of eligibility.

Professional career

Detroit Pistons (2020–2022)
Lee was selected 38th overall by the Utah Jazz in the 2020 NBA draft, then subsequently traded to the Detroit Pistons on November 22, 2020. On December 1, 2020, the Detroit Pistons signed him to a two-way contract with their NBA G League affiliate, the Motor City Cruise. On May 11, 2021, Lee scored a career-high 22 points in a 119-100 loss to the Minnesota Timberwolves. On August 6, 2021, the Pistons re-signed Lee to a multi-year contract. On April 1, 2022, Lee achieved his first career double-double, with 11 points and 12 assists in a 110-101 win against the Oklahoma City Thunder.

Raptors 905 (2022)
On September 26, 2022, Lee was traded with Kelly Olynyk to the Utah Jazz for Bojan Bogdanović. He was waived by the Jazz on October 9. On October 11, Lee signed an exhibit 10 contract with the Phoenix Suns. He was waived on October 13. On October 16, Lee signed an exhibit 10 contract with the Toronto Raptors, but was waived the same day. On October 18, Lee joined the Raptors 905 of the NBA G League.

Philadelphia 76ers (2022)
On November 23, 2022, Lee signed with the Philadelphia 76ers, replacing Michael Foster on a two-way contract. On December 26, he was waived in favor of Louis King.

Return to the 905 (2022–2023)
On December 28, 2022, Lee was re-acquired by the Raptors 905.

Phoenix Suns (2023–present) 
On January 11, 2023, Lee signed a 10-day contract with the Phoenix Suns. He signed a second 10-day contract with the Suns on January 21. Lee signed a two-way contract with the Suns on February 1. He was named to the G League's inaugural Next Up Game for the 2022–23 season.

Career statistics

Regular season 

|-
| style="text-align:left;"| 
| style="text-align:left;"| Detroit
| 48 || 7 || 16.3 || .471 || .348 || .685 || 2.0 || 3.6 || .7 || .3 || 5.6
|-
| style="text-align:left;"| 
| style="text-align:left;"| Detroit
| 37 || 0 || 16.3 || .390 || .233 || .789 || 2.4 || 2.9 || 1.0 || .3 || 5.6
|-
| style="text-align:left;"| 
| style="text-align:left;"| Philadelphia
| 2 || 0 || 5.0 || .750 || .000 ||  || .0 || 1.0 || .5 || .0 || 3.0
|-
| style="text-align:left;"| 
| style="text-align:left;"| Phoenix
| 10 || 0 || 17.3 || .455 || .500 || .774 || 2.2 || 3.3 || .2 || .1 || 7.0
|- class="sortbottom"
| style="text-align:center;" colspan="2"| Career
| 97 || 7 || 16.2 || .439 || .292 || .738 || 2.1 || 3.3 || .7 || .3 || 5.7

College

|-
| style="text-align:left;"| 2017–18
| style="text-align:left;"| Vanderbilt
| 32 || 29 || 26.8 || .462 || .307 || .726 || 3.0 || 3.1 || 1.2 || .2 || 10.6
|-
| style="text-align:left;"| 2018–19
| style="text-align:left;"| Vanderbilt
| 32 || 32 || 32.6 || .460 || .362 || .675 || 3.3 || 3.8 || 1.0 || .2 || 12.7
|-
| style="text-align:left;"| 2019–20
| style="text-align:left;"| Vanderbilt
| 32 || 17 || 32.9 || .483 || .322 || .752 || 3.5 || 4.2 || 1.5 || .3 || 18.6
|- class="sortbottom"
| style="text-align:center;" colspan="2"| Career
| 96 || 78 || 30.7 || .471 || .328 || .718 || 3.3 || 3.7 || 1.3 || .2 || 13.9

Personal life
Lee is the son of former NFL running back Amp Lee.

References

External links

Vanderbilt Commodores bio

1999 births
Living people
American expatriate basketball people in Canada
American men's basketball players
Basketball players from Phoenix, Arizona
Delaware Blue Coats players
Detroit Pistons players
Motor City Cruise players
Philadelphia 76ers players
Phoenix Suns players
Point guards
Raptors 905 players
Utah Jazz draft picks
Vanderbilt Commodores men's basketball players